Nathan Allen Driggers (born October 12, 1973) is a retired American basketball player who played in the National Basketball Association (NBA) for the Boston Celtics.  After becoming the all-time leading scorer and 1995 NAIA Player of the Year at the University of Montevallo in Alabama, Driggers appeared in 15 games for the NBA's Boston Celtics in the mid-1990s. He also played professionally in Australia, Belgium and France.

Driggers, who is the only NBA player to have played basketball for the University of Montevallo, scored a total of 36 points for a 1996–97 Celtics team that went 15–67.

Driggers was convicted of selling stolen guns in September 2017.  He was sentenced to eight years in prison.

References

External links
 Databasebasketball.com Stats

1973 births
Living people
American expatriate basketball people in Australia
American expatriate basketball people in Belgium
American expatriate basketball people in France
American men's basketball players
American sportspeople convicted of crimes
Basketball players from Chicago
Boston Celtics players
College men's basketball players in the United States
La Crosse Bobcats players
North Melbourne Giants players
Quad City Thunder players
Shooting guards
Undrafted National Basketball Association players
University of Montevallo alumni